Salma pyrastis is a species of moth of the family Pyralidae. It is found in the south eastern quarter of Australia.

The wingspan is about 30 mm.

The larvae feed on Eucalyptus species.

References

Epipaschiinae